Grand Slam (GS) is a term used in figure skating for the winning all three major annual senior-level international competitions (World Championships, Grand Prix Final, and European Championships or Four Continents Championships) within a single season within one of the four disciplines: men's singles, ladies' singles, pairs, and ice dance. Winning all three major annual senior-level international competitions at any point during the course of a career is called a "Career Grand Slam". In pair skating and ice dancing, one team may accomplish a Career Grand Slam skating together or one skater may achieve it with different partners.

Winning the gold medal at the Olympic Games in addition to the three major annual senior-level international competitions in a single season is called a "Golden Grand Slam" or "Golden Slam". A skater who wins all three major annual senior-level international competitions and the Olympic gold medal during his or her career is said to have achieved a "Career Golden Grand Slam" or "Career Golden Slam".

Winning both major junior-level international competitions (World Junior Championships, Junior Grand Prix Final) and all four major senior-level international competitions at any point during the course of a career is called a "Career Super Grand Slam" or "Super Slam".

History 

The first World Figure Skating Championships ("WC") was held in 1896. The Grand Prix of Figure Skating Final ("GPF", formerly Champions Series Final) was inaugurated in 1995. The European Figure Skating Championships ("EC"), open to skaters from European countries, first took place in 1891. The International Skating Union (ISU) established the Four Continents Figure Skating Championships ("4CC") in 1999 to provide skaters representing non-European countries. So the possibility of being the reigning champion of all three major annual senior-level international competitions (WC, GPF, and EC or 4CC) did not exist until the 1995–96 season.

Figure skating was first contested in the Olympic Games ("OG") in 1908. The first World Junior Figure Skating Championships ("JWC") were held in 1976. The Junior Grand Prix Final ("JGPF", formerly ISU Junior Series Final) was established in the 1997–98 season. So the possibility of being the super reigning champion of both major junior-level international competitions (JWC and JGPF) and all four major senior-level international competitions (OG, WC, GPF, and EC or 4CC) did not exist until the 1997–98 season.

On 29 June 2011, a report by CNN used the term Grand Slam to figure skating to describe the achievement of winning the Grand Prix Final, the Four Continents Championships, and the World Championships. On 1 April 2012, in a news report on the ladies' event of the 2012 World Figure Skating Championships by Sina Sports in the Chinese language, the term Grand Slam (大满贯) was used to describe the winning of the Grand Prix Final, the European Championships, and the World Championships. On 11 December 2016, a news report by Sina Sports on the ice dance event of the 2016–17 Grand Prix of Figure Skating Final in the Chinese language used the term Super Slam (超级大满贯) to describe the achievement of winning the World Junior Championships, the Junior Grand Prix Final, the Four Continents Championships, the World Championships, the Grand Prix Final, and the Olympic Games.

On 9 February 2020, a report by the International Skating Union (ISU) used the term Golden Slam to describe the achievement of winning all four major senior-level international competitions (Winter Olympics, World Championships, Grand Prix Final, and Four Continents Championships). On the same day, a report by the Olympic Channel, which is operated by the International Olympic Committee (IOC), used the term Super Slam to figure skating to describe the achievement of winning both major junior-level international competitions (JWC and JGPF) and all four major senior-level international competitions (OG, WC, GPF, and 4CC).

Grand Slam 
The remainder of this section is a complete list, by discipline, of all skaters who have completed the Grand Slam ordered chronologically, the numbers of Grand Slams by nation, and the first (or youngest/oldest) skater who achieved the Grand Slam.

Men's singles 
Chronological

Four men's single skaters have completed the Grand Slam. Of these skaters, two have accomplished the feat twice: Alexei Yagudin and Evgeni Plushenko.

Totals by nation

The following table shows the numbers of Grand Slams by nation.

Records

The following table shows the first (or youngest/oldest) skater who achieved the Grand Slam.

Ladies' singles 
Chronological

Four ladies' single skaters have completed the Grand Slam. Of these skaters, only one (Evgenia Medvedeva) has accomplished the feat twice.

Totals by nation

The following table shows the numbers of Grand Slams by nation.

Records

The following table shows the first (or youngest/oldest) skater who achieved the Grand Slam.

Pairs 
Chronological

Six pair teams have completed the Grand Slam. German couple of Aliona Savchenko and Robin Szolkowy is the only one pair team who has accomplished the feat twice.

Totals by nation

The following table shows the numbers of Grand Slams by nation.

Records

The following table shows the first (or youngest/oldest) skater who achieved the Grand Slam.

Ice dance 
Chronological

Eight ice dance teams have completed the Grand Slam. Russian couple of Tatiana Navka and Roman Kostomarov and American couple of Meryl Davis and Charlie White are the only two ice dance teams who have accomplished the feat twice.

Totals by nation

The following table shows the numbers of Grand Slams by nation.

Records

The following table shows the first (or youngest/oldest) skater who achieved the Grand Slam.

All disciplines 
Chronological

To date, eight single skaters and fourteen couples have completed the Grand Slam. Of these skaters, three single skaters and three couples have accomplished the feat twice.

Totals by nation

The following table shows the numbers of Grand Slams by nation.

Records

The following table shows the first (or youngest/oldest) skater who achieved the Grand Slam.

Career Grand Slam 
The career achievement of all three major annual senior-level international competitions (WC, GPF, and EC or 4CC) is termed a Career Grand Slam. Some skaters have won all three major competitions a second or more times, achieving a double, triple or quadruple Career Grand Slam.

The remainder of this section is a complete list, by discipline, of all skaters who have completed the Career Grand Slam ordered chronologically, the numbers of Career Grand Slams by nation, and the first (or youngest/oldest) skater who achieved the Career Grand Slam. The major competition at which the Career Grand Slam was achieved is indicated in bold.

Men's singles 
Chronological

Ten men's single skaters have completed the Career Grand Slam. Of these skaters, Evgeni Plushenko has achieved a triple Career Grand Slam, Alexei Yagudin and Patrick Chan have achieved a double Career Grand Slam.

Totals by nation

The following table shows the numbers of Career Grand Slams by nation.

Records

The following table shows the first (or youngest/oldest) skater who achieved the Career Grand Slam.

Ladies' singles 
Chronological

Seven ladies' single skaters have completed the Career Grand Slam. Of these skaters, Mao Asada has achieved a triple Career Grand Slam, Irina Slutskaya and Evgenia Medvedeva have achieved a double Career Grand Slam.

Totals by nation

The following table shows the numbers of Career Grand Slams by nation.

Records

The following table shows the first (or youngest/oldest) skater who achieved the Career Grand Slam.

Pairs 
Chronological

Eight pair teams have completed the Career Grand Slam. Of these teams, German couple of Aliona Savchenko and Robin Szolkowy has achieved a quadruple Career Grand Slam, Chinese couple of Shen Xue and Zhao Hongbo has achieved a triple Career Grand Slam, and Russian couple of Tatiana Totmianina and Maxim Marinin has achieved a double Career Grand Slam.

Totals by nation

The following table shows the numbers of Career Grand Slams by nation.

Records

The following table shows the first (or youngest/oldest) skater who achieved the Career Grand Slam.

Ice dance 
Chronological

Twelve ice dance teams have completed the Career Grand Slam. Of these teams, two Russian couples (Oksana Grishuk / Evgeni Platov and Tatiana Navka / Roman Kostomarov) and one American couple (Meryl Davis / Charlie White) have achieved a double Career Grand Slam.

Totals by nation

The following table shows the numbers of Career Grand Slams by nation.

Records

The following table shows the first (or youngest/oldest) skater who achieved the Career Grand Slam.

All disciplines 
Chronological

To date, seventeen single skaters and twenty couples have completed the Career Grand Slam. Of these skaters, one couple has achieved a quadruple Career Grand Slam, two single skaters and one couple have achieved a triple Career Grand Slam, and four single skaters and four couples have achieved a double Career Grand Slam.

Totals by nation

The following table shows the numbers of Career Grand Slams by nation.

Records

The following table shows the first (or youngest/oldest) skater who achieved the Career Grand Slam.

Golden Slam 

Figure skating was first contested in the Olympic Games ("OG") in 1908. Since 1924, the sport has been a part of the Winter Olympic Games. The four disciplines of men's singles, ladies' singles, pairs and ice dance also appeared as part of a team event for the first time at the 2014 Winter Olympics.

Winning the gold medal at the Olympic Games in addition to the three major annual senior-level international competitions (WC, GPF, and EC or 4CC) within a single season is called a "Golden Grand Slam" or "Golden Slam".

Only one skater have completed the Golden Slam.

Career Golden Slam 
A skater who wins all three major annual senior-level international competitions (WC, GPF, and EC or 4CC) and the Olympic gold medal during his or her career is said to have achieved a Career Golden Grand Slam or Career Golden Slam. Few skaters have won the gold medal in the individual event at the Olympic Games in addition to all three major competitions a second time, achieving a double Career Golden Slam.

The remainder of this section is a complete list, by discipline, of all skaters who have completed the Career Golden Slam ordered chronologically, the numbers of Career Golden Slams in the individual event by nation, and the first (or youngest/oldest) skater who achieved the Career Golden Slam in the individual event. The event at which the Career Golden Slam was achieved is indicated in bold.

Men's singles 
Chronological

Five men's single skaters have completed the Career Golden Slam. Of these skaters, five have won the Olympic gold medal in the individual event, and two have won the Olympic gold medal in the team event.

*The team event at the Olympics is indicated by "T".

Totals by nation

The following table shows the numbers of Career Golden Slams in the individual event by nation.

Records

The following table shows the first (or youngest/oldest) skater who achieved the Career Golden Slam in the individual event.

†Records in the individual event

Ladies' singles 

Only two ladies' single skater has completed the Career Golden Slam. Both of these ladies have also completed the Career Super Grand Slam by winning every major competition in their career, both junior and senior, including the Olympics.

Yuna Kim is the first, Alina Zagitova is the youngest lady to do so.

Pairs 
Chronological

Thirteen pair skaters have completed the Career Golden Slam. Of these skaters, thirteen have won the Olympic gold medal in the individual event, and two teams have won the Olympic gold medal in the team event.

*The team event at the Olympics is indicated by "T".

Totals by nation

The following table shows the numbers of Career Golden Slams in the individual event by nation.

Records

The following table shows the first (or youngest/oldest) skater who achieved the Career Golden Slam in the individual event.

†Records in the individual event

Ice dance 
Chronological

Six ice dance teams have completed the Career Golden Slam. Of these skaters, all have won the Olympic gold medal in the individual event, and only one team have won the Olympic gold medal in the team event.

Oksana Grishuk and Evgeni Platov are the only two skaters who have achieved a double Career Golden Slam.

*The team event at the Olympics is indicated by "T".

Totals by nation

The following table shows the numbers of Career Golden Slams in the individual event by nation.

Records

The following table shows the first (or youngest/oldest) skater who achieved the Career Golden Slam in the individual event.

†Records in the individual event

All disciplines 
Chronological

To date, five men's single skaters, two ladies' single skater, thirteen pair skaters and six ice dance teams have completed the Career Golden Slam. Of these skaters, five men's single skaters, two ladies' single skater, thirteen pair skaters and six ice dance teams have won the Olympic gold medal in the individual event; three men's single skaters, two pair teams and only one ice dance team have won the Olympic gold medal in the team event.

*The team event at the Olympics is indicated by "T".

Totals by nation

The following table shows the numbers of Career Golden Slams in the individual event by nation.

Records

The following table shows the first (or youngest/oldest) skater who achieved the Career Golden Slam in the individual event.

†Records in the individual event

Super Slam 
Winning both major junior-level international competitions (JWC and JGPF) and all four major senior-level international competitions (OG, WC, GPF, and EC or 4CC) at any point during the course of a career is called a "Career Super Grand Slam" or "Super Slam".

The remainder of this section is a complete list, by discipline, of all skaters who have completed the Super Slam ordered chronologically, the numbers of Super Slams by nation, and the first (or youngest/oldest) skater who achieved the Super Slam. The major competition at which the Super Slam was achieved is indicated in bold.

Men's singles 

Yuzuru Hanyu is the only men's single skater who has ever completed the Super Slam.

Two men's single skaters have won one major junior-level international competitions (JWC) and all four major senior-level international competitions (OG, WC, GPF, and EC), but the Junior Grand Prix Final (JGPF) did not exist when they were juniors.

Ladies' singles 

Two ladies' single skaters have completed the Super Slam.

Pairs 

One Pair team and four pair skaters have completed the Super Slam.

One pair skater has won one major junior-level international competitions (JWC) and all four major senior-level international competitions (OG, WC, GPF, and EC), but the Junior Grand Prix Final (JGPF) did not exist when he was a junior skater.

Ice dance 

Only two ice dancers have completed the Super Slam.

Four ice dancers have won one major junior-level international competitions (JWC) and all four major senior-level international competitions (OG, WC, GPF, and EC), but the Junior Grand Prix Final (JGPF) did not exist when they were juniors.

All disciplines 
Chronological

To date, only one men's single skater, two ladies' singles skaters, four pair skaters (including one pair team), and two ice dancers have completed the Super Slam.

Totals by nation

The following table shows the numbers of Super Slams by nation.

Records

The following table shows the first (or youngest/oldest) skater who achieved the Super Slam.

See also 
Major senior events
 Figure skating at the Olympic Games
 List of Olympic medalists in figure skating
 List of Olympic medalists in figure skating by age
 ISU World Figure Skating Championships
 World Figure Skating Championships cumulative medal count
 ISU European Figure Skating Championships
 All-time European Figure Skating Championships medal table
 ISU Four Continents Figure Skating Championships
 Four Continents Figure Skating Championships cumulative medal count
 ISU Grand Prix of Figure Skating Final

Major junior events
 ISU World Junior Figure Skating Championships
 ISU Junior Grand Prix of Figure Skating Final

Others
 ISU World Standings and Season's World Ranking
 List of highest ranked figure skaters by nation
 List of ISU World Standings and Season's World Ranking statistics
 Major achievements in figure skating by nation
 Figure skating records and statistics

Notes

References

General 
Major senior events
 ISU – Olympic Games Figure Skating results:
 1908–2002 Men Ladies Pairs Ice dance
 2006 2010 2014 2018 2022
 ISU World Figure Skating Championships results:
 1896–2003 Men Ladies Pairs Ice dance
 2004 2005 2006 2007 2008 2009 2010 2011 2012 2013 2014 2015 2016 2017 2018 2019 2021 2022
 ISU European Figure Skating Championships results:
 1891–2004 Men Ladies Pairs Ice dance
 2004 2005 2006 2007 2008 2009 2010 2011 2012 2013 2014 2015 2016 2017 2018 2019 2020 2022
 ISU Four Continents Figure Skating Championships results:
 1999–2003 Men Ladies Pairs Ice dance
 2004 2005 2006 2007 2008 2009 2010 2011 2012 2013 2014 2015 2016 2017 2018 2019 2020 2022
 ISU Grand Prix of Figure Skating Final results:
 1999–00 2000–01 2001–02 2002–03 2003–04 2004–05 2005–06 2006–07 2007–08 2008–09 2009–10 2010–11 2011–12 2012–13 2013–14 2014–15 2015–16 2016–17 2017–18 2018–19 2019–20 2022–23

Major junior events
 ISU World Junior Figure Skating Championships results:
 1976–2007 Men Ladies Pairs Ice dance
 2004 2005 2006 2007 2008 2009 2010 2011 2012 2013 2014 2015 2016 2017 2018 2019 2020 2022
 ISU Junior Grand Prix of Figure Skating Final results:
 1999–00 2000–01 2001–02 2002–03 2003–04 2004–05 2005–06 2006–07 2007–08 2008–09 2009–10 2010–11 2011–12 2012–13 2013–14 2014–15 2015–16 2016–17 2017–18 2018–19 2019–20 2022–23

Specific

External links 
 International Skating Union

 
Figure skating records and statistics
Figure skating tours and series